This is a list of public art in Kent, a county in South East England. This list including statues, busts and other memorials and applies only to works of public art on permanent display in an outdoor public space and as such does not include, for example, artworks in museums.

Canterbury

Chatham

Dover

Gillingham

Gravesend

Knowlton

Maidstone

Northfleet

Westerham

Wittersham

References

Kent
Lists of buildings and structures in Kent